Two ships of the Donaldson Atlantic Line were named Carmia:

, in service 1925–29
, in service 1946–54

Ship names